Triviella neglecta is a species of gastropods belonging to the family Triviidae.

The species is found in Southern Africa.

The species inhabits marine environments.

References

Triviidae